Kourris Erimis is a Cypriot football club based in Erimi, Cyprus. Founded in 1966 was playing 1 season in Second and 1 season in Fourth Division.

Current squad

Honours
STOK Elite Division:
  Winners (1): 2017–18 (shared record)

References

Football clubs in Cyprus
Association football clubs established in 1966
1966 establishments in Cyprus